is a 1999 Japanese and French film. The story is based on the last script written by Akira Kurosawa and is directed by his former assistant director of 28 years, Takashi Koizumi.  It was awarded a Japanese Academy Award in 1999. It was chosen as Best Film at the Japan Academy Prize ceremony.

Synopsis
A group of travelers are stranded in a small country inn when the local river floods.  As the bad weather continues, tensions rise amongst the travelers trapped at the inn.  A traveling rōnin (masterless samurai), Ihei Misawa takes it upon himself to cheer everyone up by arranging a splendid feast.  Unfortunately he has no money and in order to pay for the feast he visits the local dojos and challenges the masters there for payment, termed in the film as prize fighting.  Later, after breaking up a duel between two young retainers of the local clan, the daimyō Shigeaki is impressed by Misawa's skill and temperament, Lord Shigeaki offers Misawa employment as a sword master. Misawa has a tense interaction with the lord and his retainers, revealing his prowess at their expense.

The film also shows the tender relationship he has with his wife, Tayo, and provides insights into the way of life of a rōnin's wife.

Cast
 Akira Terao: Ihei Misawa
 Yoshiko Miyazaki: Tayo Misawa
 Shiro Mifune: Lord Nagai Izuminokami Shigeaki
 Fumi Dan: Okugata
 Hisashi Igawa: Kihei Ishiyama
 Hidetaka Yoshioka: Chamberlain Gonnojo Sakakibara
 Takayuki Katô: Hayato Naito
 Mieko Harada: Okin
 Tappie Shimokawa
 Tatsuo Matsumura: Sekkyo-Bushi Jii, the Old Preacher
 Tatsuya Nakadai: Tsuji Gettan

Release
After the Rain premiered at the Venice Film Festival on October 25, 1999. It was released in Japan on January 22, 2000 where it was distributed by Toho. It was released in France on May 3, 2000 where it was distributed by Opening Distribution.

Awards
 1999 - NOMINATED AFI Fest: Grand Jury Prize Award (Takashi Koizumi)
 1999 - WON São Paulo International Film Festival: Mostra Special Award (Takashi Koizumi)
 1999 - WON Venice Film Festival: CinemAwenire Award (Takashi Koizumi)
 2000 - WON Nikkan Sports Film Awards for Best Actor (Akira Terao)
 2001 - WON Awards of the Japanese Academy for Best Actor (Akira Terao), Best Art Direction, Best Cinematography, Best Film, Best Lighting, Best Music Score, Best Screenplay, Best Supporting Actress (Mieko Harada)
 2001 - NOMINATED Awards of the Japanese Academy for Best Actress (Yoshiko Miyazaki), Best Director, Best Editing, Best Sound, Best Supporting Actor (Shiro Mifune)
 2001 - WON Blue Ribbon Awards for Best Supporting Actress (Yoshiko Miyazaki)
 2001 - WON Mainichi Film Awards for Best Cinematography
 2001 - WON Portland International Film Festival: Audience Award (Takashi Koizumi)

Notes

Bibliography

External links
 
 
 
  
 
 
 

1999 films
French drama films
1990s Japanese-language films
Jidaigeki films
Samurai films
Picture of the Year Japan Academy Prize winners
Films with screenplays by Akira Kurosawa
Films scored by Masaru Sato
Toho films
1990s Japanese films
Japanese drama films